The Buster Posey Award, formerly known as the Johnny Bench Award, was created in 2000 to honor college baseball's top catcher in the National Collegiate Athletic Association's Division I. The award is administered by the Greater Wichita Area Sports Commission and presented after the conclusion of the College World Series. Originally named for Johnny Bench, it was renamed in honor of Buster Posey in 2019.

Schools nominate their catchers during the season to create the official watch list. A select committee of 20 individuals narrows the watch list down to the semifinalists. Two rounds of voting by Division I head coaches determine the three finalists and eventual recipient of the Buster Posey Award. The current holder of the award is Matheu Nelson.

Winners

See also

List of college baseball awards

Notes

References

External links

JohnnyBench.com
History and selection process

College baseball trophies and awards in the United States
Awards established in 2000